Occidozyga tompotika is a species of frog in the family Dicroglossidae. It is endemic to Sulawesi, Indonesia, where it is known from the Balantak Mountains in the Central Sulawesi Province. It is named after Mount Tompotika, its type locality.

Description
The body is robust and plump. Males are slightly smaller than females and have some secondary sexual characters including enlarged thenar tubercle at the dorsal surface of first finger and paired vocal sac, but are similar to females in body proportions. The tympanum is hidden. The dorsum is uniformly coloured dark brown or blackish. Lower parts and gular surfaces are heavily marbled with dark brown. Some specimens have a light middorsal line. The finger and toe tips are expanded; the toes are half-webbed. Tadpoles are not known.

Habitat and ecology
Its more webbed toes suggest that it is more aquatic than the related Occidozyga semipalmata. Other ecological data are not reported.

References

tompotika
Endemic fauna of Indonesia
Amphibians of Sulawesi
Amphibians described in 2011